The Washington Marriott Wardman Park was a hotel on Connecticut Avenue adjacent to the Woodley Park station of the Washington Metro in the Woodley Park neighborhood of Washington, D.C. The hotel had 1,152 rooms,  of event space, and  of exhibit space. It opened in 1918 and closed in 2020. The owner filed for bankruptcy in 2021 and the property was sold to Carmel Partners for $152.2 million, with plans for redevelopment.

The Wardman Tower wing was added to the National Register of Historic Places on January 31, 1984.

History

Original 1918 hotel structure

The original hotel on the site was built between 1917 and 1918 by local developer Harry Wardman and was designed by local architect Frank Russell White. It was an eight-story, red brick structure modeled on The Homestead resort in Virginia. The hotel was the largest in the city, with 1,200 rooms and 625 baths. It was nicknamed Wardman's Folly, due to its location far outside the developed area of Washington at the time.

The hotel opened as the Wardman Park Inn on November 23, 1918, just days after the 1918 Armistice ended World War I. No elaborate opening festivities were held, since public gatherings were illegal during the Spanish flu pandemic. The hotel was hugely successful due to the housing shortage caused by the growth of Washington, D.C. during World War I. Within a year of its opening, the property was renamed the Wardman Park Hotel. It attracted prominent guests and tenants; foreign ambassadors, members of Congress, and Vice President Marshall took up residence.

In 1928, the hotel added an eight-story, 350-room residential-hotel annex designed by architect Mihran Mesrobian. That building, now converted into condominiums, is the only surviving portion of the original Wardman Park, known as the Wardman Tower, which is listed on the National Register of Historic Places. Wardman was forced to sell the hotel in 1931 due to the Great Depression, and the hotel was acquired by Washington Properties.

Before the United States entered World War II, a British spy named Cynthia operated out of the premises as she spied on the Vichy French Embassy. At night, she would visit her lover, an embassy employee whom she had compromised, and steal secret documents, transport them back to the hotel, and photograph them in a lab she had set up in her room.

The hotel contained a full-service drug store/pharmacy; the pharmacist was known as Doc Wardman. There was also a U.S. Post Office and shops in the basement, including a butcher, grocery store, and dry cleaner that was stocked even during World War II.

In the late 1940s, the Olympic-size swimming pool was used by the 5th Marine Reserves, who were taught how to swim with their clothes on.

The first televised broadcast of NBC's Meet the Press took place in 1947 in the Wardman Tower, where host Lawrence Spivak lived. Other shows broadcast from the hotel include The Camel News Caravan, The Today Show (Frank Blair segments), and The Arthur Murray Dance Program.

In 1953, Sheraton Hotels purchased Washington Properties Inc., owner of the Wardman Park Hotel and the Wardman-built Carlton Hotel. Renamed the Sheraton-Park Hotel, its focus shifted from longer-term residents to overnight guests. Substantial additions were made to the property, including large new ballrooms and a 1964 addition known as the Motor Inn and later known as the Park Tower.

In August 1962, Army Special Forces soldiers trained by rappelling down the side of the hotel.

In 1972, Sheraton began planning to replace the aging main wing of the hotel. In 1977, the company presented plans to local residents groups for a modern, 1,050-room hotel to be built on the 12-acre property. Construction began in early 1979. The furniture and fittings of the original 950-room 1918 structure were sold to the public in June 1979 and demolition of the original wing began on July 25, 1979, to allow further construction of the new wing. The 500 rooms in the Wardman Tower and Motor Inn wings remained open throughout construction.

Second 1980 hotel structure
The partially-completed new $104 million building opened in October 1979 as the Sheraton Washington Hotel, the largest hotel and convention complex on the East Coast. The new wing was fully completed and opened in August 1980.

While construction was still underway, in 1979, Sheraton sold an interest in the hotel to the John Hancock Life Insurance Company. In 1985, John Hancock bought out Sheraton's remaining interest in the hotel, but paid the chain to continue managing the property. In August 1997, John Hancock filed a breach-of-contract suit against the hotel chain, by then renamed ITT Sheraton, alleging mismanagement of the hotel. In March 1998, a federal judge in Delaware ordered ITT Sheraton to withdraw as manager of the hotel. Marriott International took over management of the property that month, renaming it the Marriott Wardman Park Hotel.

In January 1999, Thayer Lodging Group of Annapolis, Maryland, run by two former Marriott executives, purchased the hotel from John Hancock for $227 million and spent another $100 million on renovations.

In 2005, Thayer Lodging Group sold the hotel to JBG Smith and CIM Group for $300 million.

JBG planned to convert a portion of the hotel into luxury condominiums and construct a 200-unit condominium building on a  lot next to the hotel. JBG also said it would demolish the hotel's parking garage and main ballroom, and spend $50 million to renovate the guest rooms, add dining space, build a new fitness center, and improve the exhibition and meeting space. Marriott, which managed the hotel, had the right to veto the conversion of hotel rooms into condos if revenues on the remaining hotel section fell below a specified number. Hotel revenues declined during the Great Recession, and Marriott exercised its right to stop the conversion of the hotel into condominiums.

On November 20, 2008, United States Attorney General Michael Mukasey collapsed and lost consciousness at the hotel while giving a speech to the Federalist Society. He revived and was taken to George Washington University Hospital.

On March 29, 2010, Superior Court of the District of Columbia Judge Natalia Combs Greene granted partial summary judgment and a motion to dismiss. A partial out-of-court settlement had already been reached by the parties giving JBG some limited ability to move forward on the condo project, but that agreement now seemed unnecessary given the court's ruling. The parties suspended litigation against one another to negotiate, but litigation resumed on June 8, 2010.

The parties in the various lawsuits resolved their legal dispute on July 1, 2010, allowing construction to resume.

After the collapse of the housing market during the financial crisis of 2007-2008, JBG decided to construct an apartment building on the vacant acreage rather than condominiums. D.C.-based architect David M. Schwarz designed an eight-story, 212-unit building for the company. Originally called Wardman West, the name was later changed to 2700 Woodley and then later to The Woodley. In June 2014, after the building was completed, but before it was leased, JBG sold The Woodley for $195 million, or $920,000 per unit, to TIAA-CREF, which set a record for the highest price-per-unit ever paid for a multifamily project in the D.C. metropolitan area.

In 2015, JBG renovated floors 3 to 8 of the Wardman Tower into 32 luxury condominiums, while the first and second floors remained part of the hotel business. The project was financed by $54 million from North America Sekisui House LLC (NASH), the North American division of the largest homebuilding corporation in Japan. One of the condominium units sold for $8.4 million.

In January 2018, JBG Group and CIM Group, which had owned roughly equal interests in the hotel, sold a controlling interest in the property (66.67%) to Pacific Life, with JBG and CIM each retaining 16.67% ownership. In February 2020, CIM Group sold its interest in the hotel.

In March 2020, the hotel closed temporarily, due to the COVID-19 pandemic. On June 22, 2020, the hotel's owners notified the workers' union that they might close the hotel permanently.

On September 3, 2020, Pacific Life petitioned in a Delaware court to dissolve its ownership partnership with JBG. The two companies resolved their dispute on October 2, 2020.

On October 6, 2020, Marriott sued Pacific Life (which owned 80% of the property) and JBG Smith (which owned 20%). Marriott claimed the two companies were intentionally failing to invest contractually obligated capital in the hotel to force the property to close so it could be redeveloped, cheating Marriott of fees to be earned from its long-term management contract.

In October 2020, JBG Smith transferred its ownership stake in the hotel to Pacific Life with a zero value.

On January 11, 2021, the owning entity, Pacific Life subsidiary Wardman Hotel Owner LLC, filed for bankruptcy, announced that the hotel would be closed permanently, and ended its management contract with Marriott.

In December 2021, the property was sold to Carmel Partners for $152.2 million, with plans for redevelopment.

Residents
The Wardman Tower building was home to several politicians and other public figures, as follows:

 President Lyndon B. Johnson for about 45 days as Vice President of the United States
 Vice President of the United States Spiro Agnew 
 Vice President of the United States Charles Curtis
 Actress Marlene Dietrich
 Senator Bob Dole
 President of the United States Dwight D. Eisenhower
 Former airline Trans World Airlines (TWA) President Jack Frye and wife, Helen
 U.S. Attorney Paul M. Gagnon
 Senator Barry Goldwater
 Secretary of State Cordell Hull
 President of the United States Herbert Hoover
 Socialite Perle Mesta
 Publisher Lawrence Spivak 
 Senator Chuck Robb
 Chief Justice Frederick M. Vinson
 Vice President of the United States Henry A. Wallace
 Chief Justice Earl Warren
 Senator Milton Young
 Senator Prescott Bush
 Senator Prentiss M. Brown
 David Eisenhower and Julie Nixon Eisenhower, during the summer of 1970
 Former Peruvian Ambassador to the United States Mr. and Mrs. Celso Pastor de la Torre
 President of the British Cartographic Society Dr Alexander Kent, during the summer of 2017
 Vice President of the United States Thomas R. Marshall lived for a short time in the Wardman Park Hotel that was destroyed in 1980
 Major League Baseball player (1911–12) and lawyer, Harry Lee Spratt ("Jack Spratt") and Lafayette "Fay" Spratt

Events
The Marriott Wardman Park hosted many annual events including:
 Conservative Political Action Conference
 International Telecommunications Week (ITW) trade show and idea summit
 American Intellectual Property Law Association (AIPLA) annual meeting
 Anime USA, an anime convention

The hotel was included in the rotation of cities in which the American Contract Bridge League holds North American Bridge Championship tournaments.

The annual meeting of the Transportation Research Board was held at the Marriott Wardman Park for nearly 60 years. It was moved to the Walter E. Washington Convention Center in 2015.

In March 2017, Cvent, an event management company, ranked the Marriott Wardman Park at 87th in its annual list of the top U.S. hotels for meetings.

References

External links

 Wardman Tower condominiums official website

Hotel buildings completed in 1918
Hotel buildings completed in 1928
Hotel buildings completed in 1964
Hotel buildings completed in 1980
Hotels established in 1918
Hotels established in 1980
Hotel buildings on the National Register of Historic Places in Washington, D.C.
Colonial Revival architecture in Washington, D.C.
1918 establishments in Washington, D.C.